CHS Inc. is a Fortune 500 secondary cooperative owned by United States agricultural cooperatives, farmers, ranchers, and thousands of preferred stock holders. Based in Inver Grove Heights, Minnesota, CHS owns and operates various food processing and wholesale, farm supply, financial services and retail businesses. It also distributes Cenex brand fuel in 19 midwestern and western states as one of North America's largest c-store networks. It is a co-owner (with Mitsui & Co.) of Ventura Foods, a vegetable oil processor.

CHS is ranked 1st on the National Cooperative Bank Co-op 100 list of mutuals and cooperatives (ranked by 2012 revenue), and 96th (by 2017 revenue) in Fortune 500's 2018 list of U.S. corporations.

History 
CHS's history began in 1931 with the founding of the Farmers Union Central Exchange in Saint Paul, Minnesota. Later, the core cooperative company became Cenex, from the combination of the last two words in its previous name.

In 1998, Cenex merged with Harvest States Cooperatives. Harvest States was the product of a 1983 merger between North Pacific Grain Growers (formed 1929) and the Farmers Union Grain Terminal Association (formed 1938). The merged cooperative took the name Cenex Harvest States, adopting "CHS" as its brand name. In 2003, it changed its legal name to CHS Inc.

Co-branding with Eagle Stop
Eagle Stop is a chain of convenience stores headquartered in Missouri. , the chain has 49 locations, all in Missouri. All Eagle Stop locations are co-branded with Cenex gas stations.

See also
 CHS Ukraine

References

External links 
 
  Historical records of the Farmers Union Central Exchange are available for research use at the Minnesota Historical Society

Agriculture companies established in 1998
Companies established in 1998
Companies based in Minnesota
Agricultural cooperatives in the United States
Grain companies of the United States
Companies listed on the Nasdaq
Convenience stores of the United States